Pontal do Paraná is a municipality in the state of Paraná in the Southern Region of Brazil.

Pontal do Paraná is home to the Center for Marine Studies, Federal University of Paraná.
The municipality contains the  Rio Perequê Municipal Nature Park, created in 2001 to protect an area of mangroves in Pontal do Sul.
It also contains the  Restinga Municipal Nature Park, created at the same time.
The municipality also includes the Ilhas dos Currais Marine National Park, which protects three small islands that provide a nesting ground for marine birds and a refuge and feeding ground for fish.

See also
List of municipalities in Paraná

References

Populated coastal places in Paraná (state)
Municipalities in Paraná